is a command-line utility on a number of computer operating systems including Unix, Plan 9, Inferno and Unix-like operating systems such as Linux that prints an ASCII calendar of the given month or year. If the user does not specify any command-line options, cal will print a calendar of the current month. The command is a standard program on Unix and specified in the Single UNIX Specification.

Implementations
The cal command was present in 1st Edition Unix. A cal command is also part of ASCII's MSX-DOS2 Tools for MSX-DOS version 2. It is also available for FreeDOS. This implementation only supports the Gregorian calendar (New Style) and may be distributed freely, with or without source. The FreeDOS version was developed by Charles Dye.

Examples
$ cal
      March 1984                    
 Su Mo Tu We Th Fr Sa
              1  2  3
  4  5  6  7  8  9 10
 11 12 13 14 15 16 17
 18 19 20 21 22 23 24
 25 26 27 28 29 30 31

$ cal -3 (shows the previous, current and next month)
     June 2022             July 2022            August 2022       
Su Mo Tu We Th Fr Sa  Su Mo Tu We Th Fr Sa  Su Mo Tu We Th Fr Sa  
          1  2  3  4                  1  2      1  2  3  4  5  6  
 5  6  7  8  9 10 11   3  4  5  6  7  8  9   7  8  9 10 11 12 13  
12 13 14 15 16 17 18  10 11 12 13 14 15 16  14 15 16 17 18 19 20  
19 20 21 22 23 24 25  17 18 19 20 21 22 23  21 22 23 24 25 26 27  
26 27 28 29 30        24 25 26 27 28 29 30  28 29 30 31

$ cal 2023
                            2023
      January               February               March          
Su Mo Tu We Th Fr Sa  Su Mo Tu We Th Fr Sa  Su Mo Tu We Th Fr Sa  
 1  2  3  4  5  6  7            1  2  3  4            1  2  3  4  
 8  9 10 11 12 13 14   5  6  7  8  9 10 11   5  6  7  8  9 10 11  
15 16 17 18 19 20 21  12 13 14 15 16 17 18  12 13 14 15 16 17 18  
22 23 24 25 26 27 28  19 20 21 22 23 24 25  19 20 21 22 23 24 25  
29 30 31              26 27 28              26 27 28 29 30 31     
                                                                  
       April                  May                   June          
Su Mo Tu We Th Fr Sa  Su Mo Tu We Th Fr Sa  Su Mo Tu We Th Fr Sa  
                   1      1  2  3  4  5  6               1  2  3  
 2  3  4  5  6  7  8   7  8  9 10 11 12 13   4  5  6  7  8  9 10  
 9 10 11 12 13 14 15  14 15 16 17 18 19 20  11 12 13 14 15 16 17  
16 17 18 19 20 21 22  21 22 23 24 25 26 27  18 19 20 21 22 23 24  
23 24 25 26 27 28 29  28 29 30 31           25 26 27 28 29 30     
30                                                                
        July                 August              September        
Su Mo Tu We Th Fr Sa  Su Mo Tu We Th Fr Sa  Su Mo Tu We Th Fr Sa  
                   1         1  2  3  4  5                  1  2  
 2  3  4  5  6  7  8   6  7  8  9 10 11 12   3  4  5  6  7  8  9  
 9 10 11 12 13 14 15  13 14 15 16 17 18 19  10 11 12 13 14 15 16  
16 17 18 19 20 21 22  20 21 22 23 24 25 26  17 18 19 20 21 22 23  
23 24 25 26 27 28 29  27 28 29 30 31        24 25 26 27 28 29 30  
30 31                                                             
      October               November              December        
Su Mo Tu We Th Fr Sa  Su Mo Tu We Th Fr Sa  Su Mo Tu We Th Fr Sa  
 1  2  3  4  5  6  7            1  2  3  4                  1  2  
 8  9 10 11 12 13 14   5  6  7  8  9 10 11   3  4  5  6  7  8  9  
15 16 17 18 19 20 21  12 13 14 15 16 17 18  10 11 12 13 14 15 16  
22 23 24 25 26 27 28  19 20 21 22 23 24 25  17 18 19 20 21 22 23  
29 30 31              26 27 28 29 30        24 25 26 27 28 29 30  
                                            31                    

$ cal 5 2014
      May 2014        
Su Mo Tu We Th Fr Sa  
             1  2  3  
 4  5  6  7  8  9 10  
11 12 13 14 15 16 17  
18 19 20 21 22 23 24  
25 26 27 28 29 30 31

Quirks (1752)

$ cal 9 1752
  September 1752
 S  M Tu  W Th  F  S
       1  2 14 15 16
17 18 19 20 21 22 23
24 25 26 27 28 29 30

The Gregorian calendar reform was adopted by the Kingdom of Great Britain, including its possessions in North America (later to become eastern USA and Canada), in September 1752. As a result, the September 1752 cal shows the adjusted days missing. This month was the official (British) adoption of the Gregorian calendar from the previously used Julian calendar. This has been documented in the man pages for Sun Solaris as follows. "An unusual calendar is printed for September 1752.  That  is the  month when 11 days were skipped to make up for lack of leap year adjustments." The Plan 9 from Bell Labs manual states: "Try ." Date of adoption of the reform differs widely between countries so, for some users, this feature may be a bug.

See also
 Cron – process for scheduling jobs to run on a particular date
 List of Unix commands

References

Sources

External links

 
 
 
 
 
 
 Source of explanation of cal 9 1752 phenomena (humor)

Calendaring software
Cal
Unix SUS2008 utilities
Plan 9 commands
Inferno (operating system) commands